Freight Rover was a British commercial vehicle manufacturer based in the Washwood Heath area of Birmingham, England.

History

Freight Rover was created as a division of the Land Rover Group of British Leyland (BL) in 1981, creating a new single brand for BL's panel van business. Essentially Freight Rovers were face-lifted, badge engineered 1st gen Leyland Sherpas.

Under later company organisation changes, Freight Rover became part of the Leyland Trucks division of BL.

In 1987, the Leyland Trucks division of, what was by then, the Rover Group (following the renaming of BL in 1986), merged with the Dutch truck company DAF Trucks to form DAF NV, which was later floated on the Dutch stock market. The British arm of the new company traded as Leyland DAF, with two main sites in the UK: the truck plant in Leyland and the vans plant in Washwood Heath.

Following the collapse of DAF NV in 1993, the van business was the subject of a management buyout and a new independent van company, LDV Group, was established.

Vehicles
Sherpa/200 Series
300 Series

References

External links

British Leyland
Defunct motor vehicle manufacturers of England
Manufacturing companies based in Birmingham, West Midlands
Defunct truck manufacturers of the United Kingdom
Vehicle manufacturing companies established in 1981
Vehicle manufacturing companies disestablished in 1987
1981 establishments in England
1987 disestablishments in England
1987 mergers and acquisitions
British companies established in 1981
British companies disestablished in 1987